Aitara is Värttinä's 5th album, released in 1994 in Finland. In 1995, it was released by King Records in Japan, Music & Words in Benelux, and Xenophile Records in the United States, where it spent five weeks at #1 on the CMJ World Music charts.  In 2003, it was re-released in Finland by BMG, and has been re-released in the U.S. by NorthSide.

Aitara was named "Best Contemporary World Music Album" by the National Association of Independent Record Distributors.

For their second video, Värttinä used "Yötulet" from this album.

Track listing
"Katariina" – 2:14
"Tumala" – 3:28
"Maamo" ("Mother") – 3:59
"Niin mie mieltynen" ("The Beloved") – 4:02
"Mie tahon tanssia" ("I Want To Dance") – 3:05
"Tammi" ("The Oak") – 4:04
"Pirsta" ("Silver") – 2:33
"Outona omilla mailla" ("A Stranger In My Own Land") – 3:27
"Travuska" – 4:52
"Yötulet" ("The Night Fire") – 3:04
"Kannunkaataja" ("The Tippler") – 3:59
"Aitara" – 2:49

Personnel

Värttinä
Mari Kaasinen – vocals
Sari Kaasinen – vocals
Kirsi Kähkönen – vocals
Sirpa Reiman – vocals
Janne Lappalainen – bouzouki, reeds, whistles
Pekka Lehti – string bass, Hammond organ
Riitta Potinoja – 5-row accordion, Hammond organ
Kari Reiman – violin, kantele, cimbalom
Antto Varilo – guitars, cümbüs tanbur

Guest
Anssi Nykänen – Aitara-drums

Singles

Tumala, Travuska
A single containing "Tumala" and "Travuska" was released by Mipu Music in Finland in 1994.

Mie Tahon Tanssia, Kannunkaataja
In 1995, a single containing "Mie Tahon Tanssia" and "Kannunkaataja" was released in Finland by Mipu Music.

Yötulet
In 1996, a single containing "Tuulilta Tuleva" and "Kokko" from the album Kokko and "Yötulet" from this album was released by Nonesuch in Australia.

External links
Värttinä's page with samples, lyrics, and English translations
RealAudio (.ram) file of entire album from Green Linnet

1994 albums
Värttinä albums